Let America Laugh is a 2003 documentary film produced and directed by Lance Bangs of stand-up comedian David Cross's tour of small alternative rock clubs. While it does feature small portions of David's stand-up routines, it consists mostly of interactions between David and the people accompanying him on tour.

Each segment on the DVD has a title taken from a Bible tract by Jack T. Chick (Is There Another Christ?, Gomez Is Coming, This Was Your Life).
The DVD has several 'Easter Eggs'. While on 'special features' after idling, will play phone messages. You can also press up from 'Pilar tells a story or down from 'Main Menu' to make David's glasses black, click on for a secret bit.

Legal case
In October 2005, Cross was sued by Nashville club manager Thomas Weber, accusing Cross of taping him without permission for Let America Laugh, in violation of Weber's privacy rights. In April 2006 the case against David Cross himself was dismissed, leaving Thomas Weber to face Warner Music, Sub-Pop, WEA Corporation, and the Alternative Distribution Alliance. In June, the four companies together offered Weber an 'offer of judgement' of $30,000. Weber then attempted to force each of the four companies to pay $30,000 and in the end received nothing. The case was dismissed on July 25, 2006.

References

2003 live albums
Works by David Cross
Documentary films about comedy and comedians
Films directed by Lance Bangs
2000s English-language films